The Gruta de las Maravillas (English: "Grotto of the Marvels") is a cave in the town center of Aracena, Andalusia, Spain. It was the first Spanish cave to be opened to the public in 1913. It includes a total of 2130 subterranean meters. According to popular tradition its discoverer was a shepherd, and the first historical reference of its existence dates from 1886.

References

External links
 Gruta de las Maravillas - visiting information 

Caves of Andalusia
Maravillas
Show caves in Spain
Tourist attractions in Andalusia